Al Hazzanah is a suburb in the city of Sharjah, United Arab Emirates.

Populated places in the Emirate of Sharjah